The following are the telephone codes in Mauritania.

Calling formats 
 xxxx xxxx Calls within Mauritania
 +222 xxxx xxxx Calls from outside Mauritania
The NSN length is 8 digits.

List of area codes in Mauritania 

Mobile Telephone Numbers 

Each mobile operator are assigned prefixes by blocks. The assignment varies by operator

Numbers are followed as the first two are prefixes followed by 6 digits.

eg. 24XXXXXX

References

External links
 ITU allocations list

Mauritania
Telecommunications in Mauritania
Telephone numbers